The Chairperson and CEO of the Indian Railway Board is the administrative head of the Indian Railways, which functions under the overall control of the Parliament of India through the Minister for railways. The chairperson also serves as ex-officio Principal Secretary to the Government of India for the Ministry of Railways.

History

British Raj
The Indian Railway Board was constituted in 1922, with a Chief Commissioner of Railways as its head, who was solely responsible to the Government for decisions on technical matters and for advising the Government on matters of policy.

After Independence
In April, 1951 the post of chief commissioner was abolished and the seniormost functional member was appointed the chairman of the board.

List of heads of Indian Railways

Chief Commissioners of Railway, 1922–51

Chairmen Railway Board, 1951–present

References

- 

Ministry of Railways (India)
Indian Railways officers
Chairpersons of the Railway Board